The 2015 IIHF Women's World Championship was the 16th such event hosted by the International Ice Hockey Federation. The competition also served as qualifications for the 2016 competition. Venues included the Malmö Isstadion, and Rosengårds Ishall.

United States defeated Canada in the gold medal game 7–5, securing their sixth title. Finland won the bronze medal by beating Russia 4–1.

Teams
The tournament was contested between eight teams from 28 March to 4 April 2015 in Malmö, Sweden.

Group A

Group B

Venues

Format
The preliminary round was divided into two pools that placed the top four seeds into Group A, and the bottom four in Group B. The top two finishers in Group A advanced directly to the semifinals, while the two remaining teams and the top two in Group B played a quarterfinal round. The bottom two teams from Group B played a relegation series to determine the one team that gets relegated.

Match officials
10 Referees and 9 linesman were selected for the tournament.

Referees
 Gabrielle Ariano-Lortie
 Anna Eskola
 Kaisa Ketonen
 Marie Picavet
 Nicole Hertrich
 Gabriella Gran
 Katarina Timglas
 Drahomira Fialova
 Katie Guay
 Jamie Huntley

Linesman
 Bettia Angerer
 Stephanie Gagnon
 Ilona Novotná
 Kaire Leet
 Jenni Heikkinen
 Lisa Linnek
 Anna Nygard
 Veronica Johansson
 Kate Connolly

Rosters

Each team's roster consisted of at least 15 skaters (forwards, and defencemen) and 2 goaltenders, and at most 20 skaters and 3 goaltenders. All eight participating nations, through the confirmation of their respective national associations, had to submit a roster by the first IIHF directorate.

Preliminary round
The schedule was announced on 10 September 2014.

All times are local (UTC+2).

Group A

Group B

Relegation series
The third and fourth placed team from Group B played a best-of-three series to determine the relegated team.

Final round

Quarterfinals

Semifinals

Bronze medal game

Gold medal game

Ranking and statistics

Final standings

Scoring leaders
List shows the top skaters sorted by points, then goals.

GP = Games played; G = Goals; A = Assists; Pts = Points; +/− = Plus/minus; PIM = Penalties in minutes; POS = Position
Source: IIHF.com

Goaltending leaders
Only the top five goaltenders, based on save percentage, who have played at least 40% of their team's minutes, are included in this list.

TOI = Time on ice (minutes:seconds); SA = Shots against; GA = Goals against; GAA = Goals against average; Sv% = Save percentage; SO = Shutouts
Source: IIHF.com

Awards
Best players selected by the directorate:
 Best Goaltender:  Nana Fujimoto
 Best Defenceman:  Jenni Hiirikoski
 Best Forward:  Hilary Knight
Source: IIHF.com

All-star team
Goaltender: 
Defence: , 

References

External links
Official website

 
IIHF Women's World Ice Hockey Championships
2015
World
World
2015 in ice hockey
March 2015 sports events in Europe
April 2015 sports events in Europe
Women's ice hockey competitions in Sweden
International sports competitions in Malmö
2015 in Swedish women's sport
2010s in Malmö